The 2015–16 National One Day Cup was the thirty-first edition of the National One Day Championship, the premier List A cricket domestic competition in Pakistan. It was held from 10 to 29 January 2016.

The trophy was shared by National Bank of Pakistan and Islamabad after the final was abandoned without a ball being bowled due to rain.

Group stage
The top two teams in each group after the round-robin stage (highlighted) qualified for the knockout stage.

Source:Cricinfo

Knockout stage

References

National One Day Championship seasons